Simpson is an unincorporated community and census-designated place in Fell Township, Lackawanna County, Pennsylvania, United States. It is directly north of the city of Carbondale on Pennsylvania Route 171.  As of the 2010 census the population of Simpson was 1,275.

Simpson was settled in 1818 and organized in 1845. It is named after Clarence D. Simpson, who was one of the large independent coal magnates in the Northern Anthracite Region. Early industries included trapping, tanning and lumbering. Later, coal mining and railroading became dominant professions. The coal miners were often immigrants from Russia, Poland, and Slovakia. Local businesses include Fell Brewing Co., makers of Pennsylvania Pioneer Beer, Mirtz Premium Ale and Fell Porter. The Klotz Throwing Company and Empire Silk Mill merged to become General Textile Mills or Gentex, another important local business. To these jobs and new quarters, working men brought their families. Many churches and schools were built by these new, proud, industrious Americans. The crowning sports achievement came in 1946 when the Fell High School basketball team won the state championship. The final class graduated from Fell High School in 1976 when a merger formed the Carbondale Area District.

Geography
Simpson is in northeastern Lackawanna County, in the southern part of Fell Township. It is bordered to the south by the city of Carbondale. Pennsylvania Route 171 is Simpson's Main Street, leading north  to Forest City and south  to the center of Carbondale.

The Lackawanna River passes through the center of Simpson, flowing southwest to the Susquehanna River at Pittston.

References

External links

Census-designated places in Lackawanna County, Pennsylvania
Census-designated places in Pennsylvania